Igor Mikhailovich Diakonoff (occasionally spelled Diakonov, ; 12 January 1915 – 2 May 1999) was a Russian historian, linguist, and translator and a renowned expert on the Ancient Near East and its languages. His brothers were also distinguished historians.

Life and career 
Diakonoff was brought up in Norway. He graduated from Leningrad State University (now Saint Petersburg State University) in 1938. In the same year he joined the staff of the Hermitage Museum in Leningrad (now Saint Petersburg). In 1949, he published a comprehensive study of Assyria, followed in 1956 by a monograph on Media. Later on, he teamed up with the linguist Sergei Starostin to produce authoritative studies of the Caucasian, Afroasiatic, and Hurro-Urartian languages.

Diakonoff was honored in 2003 with a festschrift volume published in his memory, edited by Lionel Bender, Gábor Takács, and David Appleyard. In addition to articles on Afro-Asiatic languages, it contains a five-page list of his publications compiled by Takács.

Family 
Diakonoff's family members are known for their contributions to various fields of knowledge, both sciences and humanities.
His wife and two sons became well-known researchers and achieved ranks of full professors.

Brother's family 
 Igor's brother Mikhail Mikhailovich Diakonoff was an authority in Iranian studies.
 Mikhail Diakonoff's daughter Elena Diakonova is a translator from Old and Modern Japanese.

Wives 
Igor's first wife Nina Dyakonova (1915–2013) was an historian and critic of English literature, with a special interest in English Romantic poetry of the early 19th century (Keats, Byron, Shelley) and its reception in European and Russian literature. A student of Professors Viktor Zhirmunsky and Mikhail Alexeyev, she was a professor at her alma mater Saint Petersburg State University, and later, teacher-training Herzen University.

Second wife Ninel Yankovskaya (1925–2005) was a historian, assyriologist in the State Hermitage Museum.

Sons 
Igor's sons became prominent physicists.

 Mikhail Dyakonov (born 1940) – Doctor of Physical and Mathematical Sciences, Chief Researcher\Honorary Fellow of the St. Petersburg Abram Ioffe Physicotechnical Institute of the Russian Academy of Sciences, and after that, since 1998 professor at the University of Montpellier, laureate of the State Prize of the USSR;
  (1949–2012) – Doctor of Physics and Mathematics, Deputy Head of the Sector of Theoretical Physics of High Energies, Professor B. P. Konstantinov St. Petersburg Nuclear Physics Institute of the Russian Academy of Sciences.

Selected bibliography 
 1965. Semito-Hamitic Languages. Moscow: Nauka.
 1984. Co-authored with V. P. Neroznak. Phrygian. Delmar, New York: Caravan Books.
 1985. "On the original home of the speakers of Indo-European". Journal of Indo-European Studies 13, pp. 92–174.
 1986. Co-authored with Sergei A. Starostin. Hurro-Urartian as an Eastern Caucasian Language. Munich: R. Kitzinger.
 1988. Afrasian Languages. Moscow: Nauka.
 1992. Co-authored with Olga Stolbova and Alexander Militarev. Proto-Afrasian and Old Akkadian: A Study in Historical Phonetics. Princeton: Institute of Semitic Studies.
 1995. Archaic Myths of the Orient and the Occident. Acta universitatis gothoburgensis.
 1999. The Paths of History. Cambridge: Cambridge University Press.

Sources 
 Dandamayev, M.A., Mogens T. Larsen, and J. Nicholas Postgate (editors). 1982. Societies and Languages of the Ancient Near East: Studies in Honour of I.M. Diakonoff. Warminster: Aris and Philipps.
 Bender, M. Lionel and Gábor Takács (editors). 2003. Selected Comparative-Historical Afrasian Linguistic Studies in Memory of Igor M. Diakonoff. Munich: Lincom Europa.

References

External links 
 Article on Diakonoff at Encyclopædia Iranica
 Diakonoff as a translator 
 

1915 births
1999 deaths
Writers from Saint Petersburg
People from Sankt-Peterburgsky Uyezd
Russian historians
Russian orientalists
Linguists from Russia
Linguists from the Soviet Union
Paleolinguists
Soviet historians
20th-century translators
Linguists of Caucasian languages
Linguists of Afroasiatic languages
Linguists of Hurro-Urartian languages
Indo-Europeanists
Linguists of Indo-European languages
Burials at Bogoslovskoe Cemetery
20th-century linguists